Guru Tegh Bahadur Nagar (formerly Koliwada, station code: GTBN), is a railway station on the Harbour Line of the Mumbai Suburban Railway. It is situated near the King's Circle and Sion local railway stations.

The station was originally called Koliwada railway station. It was renamed Guru Tegh Bahadur Nagar railway station in 1977.

References

Mumbai Suburban Railway stations
Railway stations in Mumbai City district
Mumbai CR railway division